Kakumäe (Estonian for "Owl Hill") is a subdistrict in the district of Haabersti, Tallinn, the capital of Estonia. It is located at the top of the Kakumäe Peninsula, which is part of the Baltic Klint in the Tallinn Bay. Kakumäe has a population of 1,733 and is one of the wealthiest regions in Estonia.

Small island Liivakari belongs to Kakumäe, located near Cape Kakumäe.

References

Subdistricts of Tallinn